The suboccipital muscles are a group of muscles defined by their location to the occiput. Suboccipital muscles are located below the occipital bone. These are four paired muscles on the underside of the occipital bone; the two straight muscles (rectus) and the two oblique muscles (obliquus).

The muscles are named
Rectus capitis posterior major goes  from the spinous process of the axis (C2) to the occipital bone.
Rectus capitis posterior minor goes from the middle of the posterior arch of the atlas to the occiput.
Obliquus capitis superior goes from the transverse process of the atlas to the occiput.
Obliquus capitis inferior goes from the spine of the axis vertebra to the transverse process of the atlas.

They are innervated by the suboccipital nerve.

Additional images

See also
 Suboccipital triangle

Muscles of the head and neck